Kostadin Folev (born 1 March 1955) is a Bulgarian boxer. He competed in the men's middleweight event at the 1980 Summer Olympics. At the 1980 Summer Olympics, he lost to Manfred Trauten of East Germany.

References

1955 births
Living people
Bulgarian male boxers
Olympic boxers of Bulgaria
Boxers at the 1980 Summer Olympics
Place of birth missing (living people)
Middleweight boxers